Richard Greenall (11 May 1806 – 27 November 1867) was Archdeacon of Chester from September 1866 until his death.

Greenall was born at Wilderspool and educated at Brasenose College, Oxford, where he matriculated in 1824, graduating B.A. in 1828, and M.A. in 1831. He  was the Incumbent at Stretton, Warrington from 1831.

References

1806 births
People from Cheshire
Alumni of Brasenose College, Oxford
Archdeacons of Chester
1867 deaths